Snacks (Supersize) is the debut album by British DJ and record producer Jax Jones, released on 6 September 2019 through Polydor Records. The album expands on his previous release, his 2018 EP Snacks as part of an experimental release strategy that involved new singles being added to the EP as they were released before the addition of six new songs for the release of the full album. In the weeks preceding the release, a brand new collaboration with Tove Lo titled "Jacques" was released as the lead single whilst the Ella Henderson collaboration "This Is Real" was promoted during the week of release. It was released as the album's second single on 21 October 2019.

Background
Snacks was originally released in November 2018 as an EP of 5 songs Jones had already released. Between the EP's release and July 2019, a number of other singles were added to the EP expanding it to 9 songs. The Head of Marketing at Polydor Records, Stephen Hallowes, noted during an interview with Music Week that this was all part of their release strategy to "reimagine the album as an ever-evolving playlist that would update on an on-going basis and eventually culminate in a full album release with extra songs".

Hallows further explained the "main purpose was to create one destination for fans to listen to all of Jax’s hits, but it also enabled us to start building an album story with [Jones] over time, which felt like a good strategy for an artist much stronger in the singles market than albums." Jones told the Official Charts Company that he did not anticipate releasing an album, he said "because I don’t sing my music, some people might only be a fan of one or two of my songs". Jones said that it is "so exciting to have an album with all my hits and new songs in one place [...] when you work with the names I did on the album, it makes you bring your A-game". He further explained that his second single, 2016's "You Don't Know Me" featuring Raye, "defined my sound and now I'm so happy to say the record is done".

Jones' own vocals appear on the song "All 4 You" and there might be plans to continue releasing new songs as part of Snacks including a song with singer Raye, who already features on the single "You Don't Know Me".

Critical reception

Narzra Ahmed from Clash praised the album for containing many hit songs, writing: "Jones has put together an impressive collection of insanely catchy songs. It's not easy to come by an album which contains hit after hit like this does. It is a joy to listen to."

Promotion
During its week of release, Snacks (Supersize) was promoted with the song "This is Real" featuring fellow British singer-songwriter Ella Henderson. In support of the album, Jones also launched his own Snacks-themed comedy game show on YouTube.

Jones announced he would be touring in 2020, with the tour to include pyrotechnics, dancers and inflatables. Dates include:

Track listing

Notes
  signifies a co-producer.
  signifies an additional producer.
 "100 Times" features un-credited vocals from MNEK.
 "Cruel" features un-credited vocals from Madison Love.
 "All 4 U" features un-credited vocals from Boy Matthews and Robert Harvey.

Charts

Notes

References

2019 debut albums
Jax Jones albums
Polydor Records albums